Mavinakoppa is a village in Dharwad district of Karnataka, India.

Demographics 
As of the 2011 Census of India there were 150 households in Mavinakoppa and a total population of 546 consisting of 280 males and 266 females. There were 59 children ages 0-6.

References

Villages in Dharwad district